John Poch (born 1966 in Erie, Pennsylvania) is an American poet, fiction writer, and critic.

Biography

John Poch holds an M.F.A. in Poetry from the University of Florida and a Ph.D. in English from the University of North Texas. He was the inaugural Colgate University Creative Writing Fellow, and since 2001 has taught in the creative writing program at Texas Tech University. He serves as series editor for the Vassar Miller Poetry Prize at the University of North Texas Press, and for ten years edited 32 Poems with poet Deborah Ager.

Awards

 Fulbright Core Scholar Fellowship (University of Barcelona, 2014) 
 New Criterion Poetry Prize 
 Donald Justice Poetry Prize 
 Dorothy Sargent Rosenberg Poetry Prize 
 Colgate Creative Writing Fellowship 
 The Nation/Discovery Prize

Publications

Poetry collections
 
 
 
 
 
 
 
 Chad Davidson and John Poch.

Chapbook

Online Works
 PBS Interview
 "Liquid Italy", Linebreak
 "Shrike", Videopoem
 "Sonnet on Time", Videopoem
 "3 Prose Poems", Hobart
 "The Ghost Town", Verse Daily
 "February Flu", Paris Review
 "Elegy for a Suicide", Poetry

References

Living people
American male poets
Texas Tech University faculty
1966 births
21st-century American poets
21st-century American male writers